Contentpolis–Ampo was a Spanish professional road bicycle racing cycling team which had UCI Professional Continental status until it folded in 2009.

Riders
As of February 8, 2008.

References

External links

Defunct cycling teams based in Spain
Cycling teams disestablished in 2009
Cycling teams established in 2008